Valeri Anatolyevich Saramutin (born 17 May 1995) is a Russian football player. He also holds the United States citizenship as he was born in Camden, New Jersey.

Club career
He made his debut in the Russian Football Premier League for FC Dynamo Moscow on 21 May 2016 in a game against FC Zenit Saint Petersburg. He has been on Dynamo's roster since 2012.

On 22 August 2018, he signed with Austin Bold FC in the US second-tier USL Championship. The contract was effective in the inaugural 2019 season for the team. He finished out the fall part of the 2018–19 season in the Russian third tier with FC Veles Moscow.

References

External links
 

1995 births
Soccer players from New Jersey
Sportspeople from Camden, New Jersey
Living people
Russian footballers
Russia youth international footballers
FC Dynamo Moscow players
Russian Premier League players
American soccer players
American people of Russian descent
Association football midfielders
FC Dynamo Saint Petersburg players
FC Veles Moscow players
Austin Bold FC players
USL Championship players
FC Olimp-Dolgoprudny players
FC Torpedo-2 players